The dr. Wahidin Sudirohusodo class is a class of hospital ships built by PAL Indonesia in Surabaya for the Indonesian Navy.

Characteristics
The hospital ships have a capacity of 643 people, including 159 patients.

Ships in the class

See also

References

 
Auxiliary ships of the Indonesian Navy
Hospital ships of Indonesia
Ships built in Indonesia